This is a list of notable performances of third party and independent candidates in United States gubernatorial elections. It is rare for candidates, other than those of the six parties which have succeeded as major parties (Federalist Party, Democratic-Republican Party, National Republican Party, Democratic Party, Whig Party, Republican Party), to take large shares of the vote in elections.

In the 369 gubernatorial elections since 1990, third party or independent candidates have won at least 5.0% of the vote 53 times (14%), while six candidates have won election (2%). The most recent third party or independent governor to win was Alaska's Bill Walker, a Republican turned independent, in 2014.

Listed below are gubernatorial elections since the 1820s in which a third party or independent candidate won at least 5.0% of the vote. Winners are shown in bold.

Notes 

Lists of elections in the United States
Third party (United States)